Hacıkənd may refer to:

Hacıkənd (Ganja), Azerbaijan
Hacıkənd, Goygol, Azerbaijan
Hacıkənd, Kalbajar, Azerbaijan